Tillandsia erubescens  is a species of  epiphytic plants of the genus Tillandsia. This species is endemic to Mexico, found over much of the country from Chihuahua to Oaxaca.

Three varieties are recognized:

Tillandsia erubescens var. arroyoensis W.Weber & Ehlers - northeastern Mexico
Tillandsia erubescens var. erubescens - much of Mexico
Tillandsia erubescens var. patentibracteata W.Weber & Ehlers - Sinaloa

Cultivars
 Tillandsia 'Cherub'
 Tillandsia 'Montoro'

Uses
The Pima of Mexico occasionally eat T. erubescens and Tillandsia recurvata flowers due to their high sugar content.

References

erubescens
Endemic flora of Mexico
Plants described in 1845
Epiphytes